Guyonne de Breüil was a French lady-in-waiting at the court of Mary, Queen of Scots in France and Scotland.

She was a daughter of Henri Lyonnet de Breil, seigneur de Paluau and Anne de Baudreuil. In 1527 she married Jean de Beaucaire, sieur de Puyguillon (1505-1578), in 1527. The Château du Puy-Guillon is at Vernusse in the Auvergne.

In June 1552, the Cardinal of Lorraine sent Jean de Beaucaire, Sieur de Puyguillon, usually known as "Peguillon", to Scotland to address the financial affairs of Mary of Guise. He became one of masters of Mary, Queen of Scots' household, retiring in 1574.

In September 1561 they both came to Scotland with Mary, Queen of Scots.

They returned to France for a visit in August 1562 with their son. Her husband, bringing letters from Mary, was a given a passport to come to London and meet Elizabeth I. They were accompanied by Mademoiselle de Fonte-Pertuis and two more of Mary's gentlewomen. The passport issued at Berwick-upon-Tweed mentions their 14 mounted servants and 12 footmen, and the colours and sizes of their horses and mares, measured in "handfuls".

Their companion, Suzanne Constant, Mademoiselle de Fontpertuis, was one of the queen's maidens, she received bedlinen with the queen's four Maries in 1561, dined with them, and was given the "second dule" mourning clothes. She was given a crimson silk chamlet gown with gold embroidery to take back with her to France in August 1562, probably for her marriage to Jean Hurault, seigneur de Veuil. Her name appears in the treasurer's accounts as "Simpartew" or "Fimpartew".

Family 
Guyonne de Breüil's daughter Marie de Beaucaire (1535-1613), was also a member of Mary's household in France. According to Pierre de Bourdeille, seigneur de Brantôme, she was a great favourite of Mary and was then known as "Mademoiselle de Villemontays". She married Sébastien, Duke of Penthièvre in 1556, a master of Mary's household. He came to Scotland as a soldier during the siege of Leith in 1560 and was known as "Martigues" from his French title. He returned to Scotland in April 1562 to request that Mary be the godmother of their daughter, Marie (1562-1623). She married Philippe Emmanuel, Duke of Mercœur in July 1579.

In 1566 Mary, Queen of Scots, made a will leaving some of her jewellery to the daughter of Martigues including a necklace with rubies, diamonds and pearls, a cottoire of pearls, a pearl headdress, and a pearl necklace.

Another daughter of Guyonne de Breüil, Françoise de Beaucaire, married a Spanish aristocrat, Pierre de Salzedo. Another daughter, Maquize de Beaucaire (1533-1609) was a nun and Abbess of Saint Georges, Rennes.

References

Court of Mary, Queen of Scots
Date of death unknown
16th-century French women